Philip Anthony Gunn (born January 27, 1963) is an American politician from the U.S. state of Mississippi. A member of the Republican Party, Gunn is the Speaker of the Mississippi House of Representatives, and represents the 56th district. He has served in the Mississippi House since 2004, and became Speaker in 2012. Gunn is the first Republican to serve as Speaker of the Mississippi House since 1876.

Early life and education
Gunn graduated from high school in Clinton, Mississippi. He attended Baylor University, where he was a walk-on for the Baylor Bears football team. He graduated from Baylor with a Bachelor of Business Administration in 1985.

Issues

Abortion 
Gunn has stated that he believes that a 12-year-old girl who was molested by a family member should be forced to carry her pregnancy to term, saying that it is his "personal belief" that child rape victims should be forced to carry their rapists's babies as he personally opposes abortion access in all cases.

Career
Gunn worked as a waiter for a year and then attended the University of Mississippi School of Law, where he graduated with a Juris Doctor. He served as president of the student government while attending law school.

2000s
Gunn was encouraged to run for election to the  Mississippi House of Representatives in 2003, due to redistricting that hurt Clinton. He faced incumbent fellow Republican Jep Barbour, the nephew of Haley Barbour. Gunn lost the primary election by 17 votes, but found an error in how the districts were drawn, disenfranchising some voters. A re-vote was scheduled, and Gunn won by 155 votes. Barbour appealed the re-vote to the Mississippi Supreme Court, which ruled in Gunn's favor in April 2004.

2010s
The Republicans became the majority of the Mississippi House following the 2011 elections, and Gunn was chosen to be their candidate for Speaker by the Republican delegation; he won the position with no opposing votes when the whole House convened on January 3, 2012. Gunn became the first Republican Speaker of the Mississippi House since Isaac Shadd, who served as Speaker from 1874 through 1876.

Following the Charleston church shooting in June 2015 and subsequent discussion of the flying of the "Confederate Battle Flag" at the South Carolina State House, Gunn publicly called for the removal of the Confederate Battle Flag from the flag of Mississippi, which was added to the flag by lawmakers in 1894.

After the resignation of Senator Thad Cochran in March 2018, it became speculated that Governor Bryant would name Gunn as Cochran's successor.

2020s
On November 9, 2022, Gunn announced he would not be seeking re-election to the State House in 2023.

Personal
Gunn's sister and parents were killed in a motor vehicle accident caused by a drunk driver.

Gunn met his wife, Lisa (née Watkins), while he attended Baylor. The couple has four children. Gunn serves as an elder in his  church.

References

External links

Campaign site
 

|-

1963 births
20th-century American lawyers
21st-century American lawyers
21st-century American politicians
Baptists from Mississippi
Baylor Bears football players
Baylor University alumni
Living people
Mississippi lawyers
People from Clinton, Mississippi
Speakers of the Mississippi House of Representatives
Republican Party members of the Mississippi House of Representatives
University of Mississippi School of Law alumni